Malo Naklo is a small settlement in the Municipality of Naklo in the Upper Carniola region of Slovenia. It was much reduced by the building of the new motorway and only two houses remain.

References

External links

Malo Naklo on Geopedia

Populated places in the Municipality of Naklo